Burnhill railway station served the village of Waskerley, County Durham, England, from 1859 to 1939 on the Stanhope and Tyne Railway.

History 
The station opened as Burn Hill Junction on 4 July 1859 by the North Eastern Railway. It was situated 200 yards north of Burnhill Junction (a military use only station). Its name was changed to Burn Hill on 1 May 1893 and changed to Burnhill in 1908. There were no platforms at the station. It closed to passengers and goods traffic on 1 May 1939.

References

External links 

Disused railway stations in County Durham
Former North Eastern Railway (UK) stations
Railway stations in Great Britain opened in 1859
Railway stations in Great Britain closed in 1939
1859 establishments in England
1939 disestablishments in England
Lanchester, County Durham